Antonio Cansino (1865–1954) was a flamenco dancer and guitarist credited with creating modern-day Spanish dance by combining classical Spanish dance and Romani flamenco. He was popularly known for dancing the bolero. He was the father of Eduardo Cansino and the grandfather of Rita Hayworth, who were both famous dancers and actors. He is the patriarch of The Dancing Cansinos. He performed for the King of Spain and instructed Rita Hayworth's first dance lesson.

Early life 
Antonio Cansino was born on 21 Apr 1865 in Seville, Andalusia, Spain. He operated dance academies in Seville and Madrid.   

He married dancer Carmen Reina. The couple had seven children who were all dancers: Eduardo, Jose, Angel, Paco, Antonio Jr., Rafael and Elisa Cansino. Since all his children were dancers, the family was known as The Dancing Cansinos.  

He immigrated to the United States around 1936.

Death 
Antonio died at General Hospital due to reoccurring heart failure (aged 88-89). A private Catholic ceremony was held. He was survived by 6 children and 7 grandchildren. He was buried at Holy Cross Cemetery.

References 

1865 births
1954 deaths
People from Seville
Flamenco dancers
Spanish flamenco guitarists
Spanish male guitarists
19th-century Spanish musicians
19th-century Spanish male musicians
20th-century Spanish musicians
20th-century Spanish male musicians
19th-century Spanish dancers
20th-century Spanish dancers
Spanish emigrants to the United States
Spanish male dancers
Burials at Holy Cross Cemetery, Culver City
Spanish people of Romani descent
Cansino family